Lokanath Choudhary (1925-2003) was an Indian politician. He was elected to the Lok Sabha, the lower house of the Parliament of India as a member of the Communist Party of India. He was elected to the Lok Sabha twice in 1989 and 1991 and thrice to the state assembly in 1957, 1961 and 1974. He Choudhury was secretary of the Utkal State Council of CPI for nine years between 1986 and 1994.

References

External links
Official biographical sketch in Parliament of India website

1925 births
2000 deaths
Lok Sabha members from Odisha
India MPs 1989–1991
India MPs 1991–1996
Odisha politicians
Communist Party of India politicians from Odisha